BeforeAfter is a 2022 compilation album of singer Daryl Hall's solo work, independent of the duo Hall & Oates. Its 30 songs draw from Hall's five studio albums—Sacred Songs (1980), Three Hearts in the Happy Ending Machine (1986), Soul Alone (1993), Can't Stop Dreaming (1996) and Laughing Down Crying (2011)—as well as from his long-running concert broadcast series, Live from Daryl's House. It was released on April 1, 2022, on Sony's Legacy Recordings imprint.

Hall released the solo retrospective because his Hall & Oates audience hadn't been exposed to much of it. "I obviously had this whole body of work that I haven't really performed other than at Live from Daryl's House. I do a lot of these songs on the Live from Daryl's House show, which is one of the reasons I started Live from Daryl’s House, so there would be an outlet for me to have to play all my music, not just the music I write for Hall & Oates. I consider what I do outside of that as just as important to me. I have a long history of working with various people and I want to bring it out there, you know? Have the world hear it and all those things."

Eight of the album's 30 tracks are from Live from Daryl's House. Guests include David A. Stewart, with whom Hall covers Stewart's band Eurythmics' hit "Here Comes the Rain Again", Monte Montgomery on a live version of Hall's "North Star", and Todd Rundgren, who joins Hall on Rundgren's hit "Can We Still Be Friends". Rundgren joined Hall on a 2022 U.S. tour in support of BeforeAfter.

Track listing
All songs written by Daryl Hall unless otherwise listed.

References 

Daryl Hall albums
2022 compilation albums
Legacy Recordings compilation albums